Venus is an unincorporated community in Knox County, Nebraska, United States.

History
A post office was established at Venus in 1880, and remained in operation until it was discontinued in 1959. The community was named for Venus, the Roman goddess of love.

References

Unincorporated communities in Knox County, Nebraska
Unincorporated communities in Nebraska